Aurimas Adomavičius (born 23 September 1993) is a Lithuanian rower.

At the 2016 European Championships, he won silver with the Lithuanian quadruple sculls team. He was also selected to the national team to represent Lithuania in the 2016 Summer Olympics.

References

External links

Lithuanian male rowers
1993 births
Living people
Rowers at the 2016 Summer Olympics
Rowers at the 2020 Summer Olympics
Olympic rowers of Lithuania
World Rowing Championships medalists for Lithuania
European Rowing Championships medalists